The Faith may refer to:

 The Faith (American band), an American hardcore punk band
 The Faith (Australian band), an Australian rock band first formed in 1987
 The Faith (album), a 2005 album from Christian hip hop artist Da’ T.R.U.T.H

See also
 Faith (disambiguation)
 Faith Band